Emertonella taczanowskii, is a species of spider of the genus Emertonella. It is distributed along United States to Argentina, India, Sri Lanka to Ryukyu Islands.

See also
 List of Theridiidae species

References

Theridiidae
Spiders of North America
Spiders of South America
Spiders of Asia
Spiders described in 1886